Quentin Durgens, M.P. is a Canadian dramatic television series, which aired on CBC Television from 1965 to 1969. It was one of the first hour-long drama series produced by the CBC, and helped to establish Gordon Pinsent as a major star in Canada. Created by George Robertson, the series first aired in 1965 under the title Mr. Member of Parliament, as a short-run series within the CBC's drama anthology The Serial. It was spun off into a standalone series and retitled Quentin Durgens, M.P. in its second season.

Plot 

Set in Ottawa, Ontario and the fictional community of Moose Falls, the series starred Pinsent as Quentin Durgens, an idealistic young lawyer who wins election as a Member of Parliament, succeeding his father in a by-election after his father's death in office. Durgens was a backbench member of the governing party in the House of Commons, but had a maverick streak and aspired to do the right thing even if it wasn't politically expedient. Some of the storylines within the series were fictionalized depictions of real-life events in Canadian politics, and the series incorporated some documentary filmmaking techniques inspired by the National Film Board.

Production 
Alan Macnaughton, the retiring Speaker of the House of Commons of Canada, and David Vivian Currie, the incumbent Sergeant-at-Arms, served as script consultants to ensure that Canadian political process was accurately depicted.

The series was frequently compared in the Canadian press to Slattery's People, an American series about a state legislator which aired on CBS in the 1964–65 season.

The cast also included Suzanne Lévesque, Budd Knapp, Cec Linder, Ovila Légaré and Chris Wiggins.

Notes

References

External links 

 

1960s Canadian drama television series
CBC Television original programming
1965 Canadian television series debuts
1969 Canadian television series endings
1960s political television series
Durgens, Quentin
Canadian political drama television series
Television shows set in Ottawa